Liliana Komorowska (born 11 April 1956) is a Polish actress and filmmaker. She has appeared in more than fifty films since 1964.

Selected filmography

References

External links
 
 

1956 births
Living people
Actresses from Gdańsk
Polish film actresses
Polish television actresses